The Weekly Packet is a weekly newspaper serving Maine's Blue Hill, Brooklin, Brooksville, Sedgwick, and Surry communities. It was founded by Jerry Durnbaugh, an Indiana transplant to Maine, in 1960. It claims a circulation of 2,200 copies, and is owned by Penobscot Bay Press, which publishes a number of other area papers under a single editor.

References

External links
Official website

Newspapers published in Maine
Publications established in 1960
Mass media in Hancock County, Maine
1960 establishments in Maine